This is a list of candidates of the 1953 New South Wales state election. The election was held on 14 February 1953.

Retiring Members

Labor
 Carlo Lazzarini (Marrickville) had died in late 1952 but no by-election was held.
 Arthur Greenup (Newtown-Annandale) the district was abolished in the 1952 redistribution, and he was defeated in the preselection contest for Marrickville.

Liberal
 Harry Turner (Gordon) had resigned in late 1952 to run for a federal seat. No by-election was held.
 George Gollan (Parramatta).

Country
 Roy Vincent (Raleigh).

Legislative Assembly
Sitting members are shown in bold text. Successful candidates are highlighted in the relevant colour.

See also
 Members of the New South Wales Legislative Assembly, 1953–1956

References

1953